Metlako Falls is a waterfall on Eagle Creek in the Columbia River Gorge National Scenic Area in Hood River County, Oregon, United States. It is the furthest downstream of the major waterfalls on Eagle Creek. Like upstream Punch Bowl Falls, Metlako is also in the form of a punchbowl. It is the upstream limit for salmon spawning in Eagle Creek.

Naming
The waterfall was discovered and named by a committee of the Mazamas in 1915 after Metlako, the Indian goddess of salmon, likely because it is the upstream limit for salmon spawning in Eagle Creek.

2016 Landslide
At the end of 2016 landslide destroyed official viewpoint, so title photo view of waterfall is not possible anymore. Eagle Creek Fire in 2017 burned trees around waterfall. It makes extremely difficult (and dangerous) to scramble to the edge of the cliff, however, due to lack of foliage top of Metlako Falls is now visible from a trail. Spring 2022 Update: local hikers asked Forest Service to develop alternative viewpoint. Work is not started yet.

See also
List of waterfalls on Eagle Creek and its tributaries

Sources
http://www.waterfallsnorthwest.com/waterfall.php?num=1561&p=0
http://www.waterfallswest.com/or_metlako.html

Waterfalls of Hood River County, Oregon
Waterfalls of Oregon
Mount Hood National Forest
Punch bowl waterfalls